South Farmingdale is a hamlet and census-designated place (CDP) in the Town of Oyster Bay in Nassau County, on the South Shore of Long Island, in New York, United States. The population of the CDP was 14,486 at the 2010 census. 

The hamlet is anchored by (and often identified as part of) neighboring Farmingdale, and is served by the Farmingdale Post Office, Farmingdale School District, and Farmingdale Library.

History 
South Farmingdale's name reflects its geographic location immediately south of and adjacent to the Incorporated Village of Farmingdale.

A railroad station named South Farmingdale previously existed in the hamlet on the Central Branch of the Long Island Rail Road. It had originally opened in 1873 and closed in 1898, and then reopened in 1936 and closed for the final time in 1972.

Geography

According to the United States Census Bureau, South Farmingdale has a total area of 2.2 square miles (5.7 km2), all land.

The CDP gained territory between the 1990 census and the 2000 census.

South Farmingdale is split between the Massapequa Creek and Seaford Creek Drainage Drainage Areas, and is located within the larger Long Island Sound/Atlantic Ocean Watershed.

Demographics

2010 census
According to the 2010 census the population was 90.1% White 83% Non-Hispanic White, 1.4% African American, 0.1% Native American, 4.5% Asian, 0.0% Pacific Islander, 2.2% from other races, and 1.7% from two or more races. Hispanics or Latinos of any race were 10% of the population.

2000 census
At the time of the 2000 census, there were 15,061 people 4,899 households, and 4,095 families residing in the CDP. The population density was 6,886.0 per square mile (2,655.3/km2). There were 4,950 housing units at an average density of 2,263.2/sq mi (872.7/km2). The racial makeup of the CDP was 93.01% White, 0.79% African American, 0.08% Native American, 3.18% Asian, 0.03% Pacific Islander, 1.85% from other races, and 1.07% from two or more races. Hispanic or Latino of any race were 5.90% of the population.

There were 4,899 households, of which 36.3% had children under the age of 18 living with them, 69.9% were married couples living together, 10.5% had a female householder with no husband present, and 16.4% were non-families. 13.5% of all households were made up of individuals, and 7.2% had someone living alone who was 65 years of age or older. The average household size was 3.07 and the average family size was 3.37.

Age distribution was 25.1% under the age of 18, 6.2% from 18 to 24, 30.8% from 25 to 44, 21.7% from 45 to 64, and 16.2% who were 65 years of age or older. The median age was 38 years. For every 100 females, there were 96.5 males. For every 100 females age 18 and over, there were 91.0 males.

The median household income was $71,168, and the median family income was $76,049. Males had a median income of $52,290 versus $36,475 for females. The per capita income for the CDP was $25,927. About 2.5% of families and 2.8% of the population were below the poverty line, including 4.4% of those under age 18 and 2.9% of those age 65 or over.

Public services

Farmingdale Postal Services
Residents of South Farmingdale have a ZIP code of 11735. They are served by the Farmingdale Post Office, located at 918 Main Street, Farmingdale, NY 11735-5426. While residents can and do typically use Farmingdale as their postal address, the post office also accepts mail that is addressed to South Farmingdale.

Library district
The Farmingdale Public Library is located at 116 Merritts Road, Farmingdale, NY 11735-3251.

School district
South Farmingdale is served by the Farmingdale School District. The district includes Farmingdale High School, Howitt Middle School, Northside Elementary School, Woodward Parkway School, Albany Avenue Elementary School in North Massepequa, and Saltzman East Memorial in Suffolk County.

Railroads
South Farmingdale is served by the Farmingdale (LIRR station) on the Ronkonkoma Branch of the Long Island Rail Road (LIRR). The station is located on Front Street, in Farmingdale. South Farmingdale is also served by the Massapequa Park (LIRR station) on the Babylon Branch. LIRR trains also run directly along the northeast boundary of the CDP using the Central Branch; however, the last station along this branch, the South Farmingdale Station, closed in 1974. It was along this stretch of the Central Branch that Mile-a-Minute Murphy set a record in 1899, pedalling a bicycle for one mile behind a train in less than one minute.

Fire
The area is served by the South Farmingdale Fire Department. The main firehouse is located at 819 Main Street, Farmingdale, NY 11735-4140. A second station is at the corner of Merrits Rd and Beverly Road.

Water
South Farmingdale has its own Water District, which has provided service to the area since 1931. It also serves North Massapequa, as well as parts of Bethpage and Seaford.

References

Oyster Bay (town), New York
Census-designated places in New York (state)
Hamlets in New York (state)
Census-designated places in Nassau County, New York
Hamlets in Nassau County, New York